The California Victory was a USL First Division professional soccer team based in San Francisco, California. It was an expansion team for the 2007 season, but ceased operation in September of that year after parent club Deportivo Alavés withdrew its support.

History
On October 12, 2006, USL President Francisco Marcos announced Dmitry Piterman, a Ukrainian American and chairman of Spanish club Deportivo Alavés, had officially acquired a USL First Division franchise beginning in the 2007 season. The Victory was the first European owned team to compete at any level of the United Football Leagues, and also the first USL First Division team in California since the demise of the San Diego Flash in 2001. The club played at Kezar Stadium, the former home of the Oakland Raiders and San Francisco 49ers.

Name
The name Victory is derived from Alavés’ home city of Vitoria-Gasteiz, the capital city of both the province of Álava and the Basque Country of Spain.

Management
Terry Fisher, a longtime football executive and coach, was the team's first general manager. The team was managed and coached by Glenn van Straatum, while US international Hugo Perez was an assistant.

Supporters
1906 Supporters was the blanket term for the supporters of the California Victory. The term 1906 referred to the 1906 earthquake and fire of San Francisco. 1906 had its roots in early fan support of the San Francisco Seals football team and the San Jose Earthquakes, who were on hiatus from MLS when the Victory began to play. They were identifiable by their custom T-shirts, colourful chants and banners draped over the rails.

California Victory Supporters Association (CVSA) was the official supporters club of the Victory. Seeing a need for community support of the club, several loyal 1906ers met at The Pig & Whistle with members of the Victory front office. There, the attending 1906ers established the CVSA. Through the sales of handmade merchandise and community outreach, the CVSA had effectively created a fan base for the Victory.

SaveTheVictory.org
SaveTheVictory.org was a movement set in motion by the Victory's official supporters club, the CVSA. The goal of the group was to raise enough money by accepting memberships to purchase the club, an ownership model based on the NFL's Green Bay Packers and influenced by My Football Club. They were however ultimately unsuccessful.

Notable former players

Year-by-year

External links
Official site
Official Save The Victory site
1906 Supporters
Article on the California Victory
Deportivo Alaves fans site (Spanish)
Deportivo Alaves' website (Spanish)

Sources

 
Deportivo Alavés
Association football clubs established in 2006
Defunct soccer clubs in California
USL First Division teams
2006 establishments in California
2007 disestablishments in California
Soccer clubs in San Francisco
Soccer clubs in California
Association football clubs disestablished in 2007